William Hanford "Big Bill" Edwards (February 23, 1877 – January 4, 1943) was an American football player who played guard for the Princeton Tigers football team of Princeton University from 1896 to 1899.

Biography
He was born on February 23, 1877, in Lisle, New York.

After graduation, he became an official, and in 1916 wrote a book entitled Football Days, which is perhaps the most extensive first-hand account of American college football in the 19th century.

In 1906, Edwards was the referee for the first game of the "Ohio League" championship between the Canton Bulldogs and the Massillon Tigers. The two-game series was the setting for a game-rigging scandal that eventually resulted in the demise of both teams.  During the scandal, members of the Bulldogs were accused of throwing the championship to the Tigers. While Edwards officiated the first game of the series, he was unavailable to referee the second game because of a prior commitment to officiate that year's Harvard–Yale game.

In 1910, he thwarted an attempt on the life of New York mayor William Gaynor by tackling the assailant and sustaining a flesh wound in the arm in the process.  For his heroism, Edwards was awarded the Carnegie Medal for Heroism.

Later that decade, U.S. President Woodrow Wilson appointed Edwards as collector of Internal Revenue for New York's Second District.

Edwards was deputy of street cleaning in New York before becoming chief of waste disposal in nearby Newark, New Jersey. In 1926, Edwards became the first president of the first American Football League, which disbanded at the end of the season. Fourteen years later, his name was mentioned as a possible president of the third AFL at the press conference announcing the formation of the league, but he did not serve in that position.

He died on January 4, 1943, in Manhattan, New York City. His funeral was held at Calvary Episcopal Church in Manhattan.

Legacy
He was elected to the College Football Hall of Fame in 1971.

See also
 List of covers of Time magazine (1920s) (October 4, 1926)

References

External links

 
 
 

1877 births
1943 deaths
19th-century players of American football
American football guards
American Football League (1926)
College football officials
Princeton Tigers football players
College Football Hall of Fame inductees
People from Lisle, New York
Players of American football from New York (state)